Carl Harvey Greenblatt (born June 17, 1972) is an American animator, storyboard artist, voice actor, writer, producer and director. He has worked on Nickelodeon's SpongeBob SquarePants and on Cartoon Network's The Grim Adventures of Billy & Mandy and Evil Con Carne. He is the creator of Cartoon Network's Chowder, Nickelodeon's Harvey Beaks, and creator and executive producer of Jellystone!, a Hanna-Barbera animated series for HBO Max produced by Warner Bros. Animation.

Early life
He was born in Plano, Texas, and raised in a Jewish family. He attended the University of Texas at Austin where he majored in advertising. He was classmates with future film critic Korey Coleman.

Career
After graduating, Greenblatt worked as an art director on several television commercials, including Chef Boyardee's Chef Jr. campaign. In 1998, he got his first job in the animation industry working as an additional storyboard artist for SpongeBob SquarePants, before graduating to full-on writer and storyboard artist. After finishing up on SpongeBob, Greenblatt became a storyboard artist on The Grim Adventures of Billy and Mandy.

In 2007, Greenblatt began Chowder, an animated show that he created and executive produced for Cartoon Network. Greenblatt collaborated with Maxwell Atoms on his new Billy & Mandy spin-off Halloween special called Underfist, in which he reprised his role as Fred Fredburger. He announced on his blog that Nickelodeon has given the go-ahead for an 11-minute pilot for a new show created by him entitled Bad Seeds (later renamed Harvey Beaks).

He announced in September 2013 that the show has since been picked up for 26 11-minute episodes, with production commencing at the beginning of 2014. He has also directed the Deadman shorts for DC Nation. From season 2 and 3 of SpongeBob he teamed up with Aaron Springer and later in season 3 he teamed up with Kaz.

On April 5, 2018, Greenblatt announced that he had now been employed by Warner Bros. Animation, adding that he has been developing "something fun" for the studio but could not yet disclose anything else about it. On October 29, 2019, the project was officially unveiled with the title of Jellystone!, described as a crossover of several Hanna-Barbera characters living in the titular town "where they can't help but make trouble for one another".

Greenblatt also plays Fish Taco, one of three main characters in an animated YouTube series titled Mexiguin since 2018. He helps mentor show creator, Joe Kozdra, in animation and creative writing alongside his voice acting contributions.

On January 29, 2021, a new Greenblatt project was registered for Disney Television Animation under the title Unnamed Pet Resort Project.

Legacy 
Scott Thill of Cartoon Brew praised Greenblatt as one of the most influential comedy writers with innovative comedic elements. Cartoon Brew also said Greenblatt "has logged a decade-and-a-half across studios and shows". James Poniewozik of Time credited Greenblatt as defining SpongeBobs comedic style. Greenblatt was a storyboard artist and one of the writers of the SpongeBob episode "Band Geeks", considered by many to be the best episode of the entire series. SpongeBob writer Kaz recalled writing with Greenblatt fun and said he was full with "weird energy".

Filmography

Television

Film

Video games

Internet

References

External links

 
 C. H. Greenblatt's current blog on Tumblr
 C. H. Greenblatt's original blog, Nerd Armada
 Frederator Studio's interview with Greenblatt

American television producers
American television writers
American male television writers
1972 births
Living people
American male voice actors
Showrunners
McCombs School of Business alumni
American storyboard artists
Animators from Texas
People from Plano, Texas
American cartoonists
American people of German-Jewish descent
Jewish American artists
Jewish American screenwriters
American voice directors
Screenwriters from Texas
Cartoon Network Studios people
Nickelodeon Animation Studio people
Warner Bros. Animation people
21st-century American Jews